Tomas Villoldo (born 28 February 1995) is an Argentine professional footballer who plays as a defender for Deportivo Riestra.

Career
Villoldo started his senior career with Club Atlético River Plate where he got after escalating trough their youth ranks.  After playing with River the Weifang Cup, he got an offer, and accepted, to play for Serbian side OFK Beograd, However, due to his young age, he failed to make a debut in the second-half of the 2015–16 Serbian SuperLiga, ending up playing only one game in the Serbian Cup during his stay in Europe. In August 2016 he returns to Argentina and joins Deportivo Riestra. After a year, he signs with Club Atlético San Miguel where he spends two highly productive seasons in Primera B Metropolitana. In 2019, he signed for Club Almirante Brown playing in Argentinian same level.

In late November 2020, Villoldo left Almirante Brown, to re-join his former club Deportivo Riestra.

References

External links 
 River Plate, Serbia and Mexico, the journey of Tomás Villoldo before joining the Mirasol
 Added one known by Jorge Benítez: Tomás Villoldo
 
 Solo Ascenso Profile

1995 births
Living people
Argentine footballers
Argentine expatriate footballers
Association football defenders
Deportivo Riestra players
Club Atlético San Miguel footballers
Club Almirante Brown footballers
OFK Beograd players
Argentine expatriate sportspeople in Serbia
Expatriate footballers in Serbia
Footballers from Buenos Aires